Khoo Fuk-lung (born 21 February 1964), also known as James Khoo, is a Hong Kong manhua artist and writer.

External links
 Khoo Fuk-lung's blog

Hong Kong artists
Hong Kong comics artists
Living people
1964 births